Pir Sabz Ali (also Romanized as Pīr Sabz ‘Alī) is a village in Kamfiruz-e Shomali Rural District, Kamfiruz District, Marvdasht County, Fars Province, Iran. At the 2006 census, its population was 268, in 64 families.

References 

Populated places in Marvdasht County